Pachymerellus zygethus is a species of centipede in the Geophilidae family. It is endemic to Australia, and was first described in 1920 by American biologist Ralph Vary Chamberlin.

Description
The original description of this species is based on a specimen measuring about 35 mm in length with 55 pairs of legs, but the number of segments in this species can range from as few as 47 to as many as 65.

Distribution
The species occurs in Tasmania.

Behaviour
The centipedes are solitary terrestrial predators that inhabit plant litter, soil and rotting wood.

References

 

 
zygethus
Centipedes of Australia
Endemic fauna of Australia
Fauna of Tasmania
Animals described in 1920
Taxa named by Ralph Vary Chamberlin